In Greek mythology, Phaon (Ancient Greek: Φάων; gen.: Φάωνος) was a mythical boatman of Mytilene in Lesbos. He was old and ugly when Aphrodite came to his boat. She put on the guise of a crone. Phaon ferried her over to Asia Minor and accepted no payment for doing so. In return, she gave him a box of ointment. When he rubbed it on himself, he became young and beautiful. Many were captivated by his beauty.

According to Athenian Theater, Sappho fell in love with him. He lay with her but soon grew to resent her and devalue her. Sappho was so distraught with his rejection that she threw herself into the sea under the superstition that she would be either cured of her love, or drowned. She was drowned. Aelian says that Phaon was killed by a man whom he was cuckolding.

Aside from Aelian, Phaon's story is told by Ovid and Lucian.  He is also mentioned by Plautus in Miles Gloriosus as being one of only two men in the whole world, who "ever had the luck to be so passionately loved by a woman" (Act 3).

''This article incorporates text from the public domain 1848 edition of Lemprière's Classical Dictionary.

References

Characters in Greek mythology